Lučići (Cyrillic: Лучићи) is a village in the municipality of Kakanj in Bosnia and Herzegovina.

Demographics 
According to the 2013 census, its population was 29.

References

Populated places in Kakanj